It's Impossible to Learn to Plow by Reading Books is the first feature film by Richard Linklater, released in 1988.  The film features little dialogue.

Plot
In its minimal and non-traditional plot, the protagonist travels about the country meeting with various acquaintances when not taking part in various mundane, day-to-day activities. There is no real rising action or climax, and Linklater's character does not change substantially throughout the course of the film.

Production
The film was shot on Super 8 mm film and edited at a public-access television cable TV station, with Linklater starring and handling all production duties. Outsider musician Daniel Johnston also appears in the film.

Release
The film never received a widespread release. It is only available on DVD and Blu-ray as a bonus feature on Slacker from The Criterion Collection.

References

External links
 

1988 films
1988 comedy-drama films
American comedy-drama films
1980s English-language films
Films directed by Richard Linklater
American independent films
1988 directorial debut films
1980s American films